Ali Al Namash (born 31 October 1982) is a Kuwaiti former footballer who played as a defender for the Kuwaiti Premier League side Al Salmiya on loan from Al Qadsia. He played for the Kuwait national team.

References

1982 births
Living people
Kuwaiti footballers
Qadsia SC players
Sportspeople from Kuwait City
Association football defenders
Kuwait international footballers
Al Salmiya SC players
Kuwait Premier League players